Halilhodžić is a Bosnian surname. Notable people with the surname include:

Omer Halilhodžić (born 1963), Bosnian automobile designer
Vahid Halilhodžić (born 1952), Bosnian footballer and manager

Bosnian surnames